Sleepy Eye is a city in Brown County, Minnesota.

Sleepy Eye may also refer to:

Sleepy Eye Creek, a tributary of the Cottonwood River in Minnesota
Sleepy Eye Lake (disambiguation)
Chief Sleepy Eye, a Sisseton-Sioux chief, see Ishtakhaba